Concord Presbyterian Church is a historic Presbyterian church located near Winnsboro, Fairfield County, South Carolina. It was built in 1818, and is a one-story, brick, gable-roofed building with a meeting house floor plan.  It has a small, rectangular, gable-roofed rear extension and sits on a granite foundation.  Also on the property is a cemetery with a cast-iron fence and gates.

It was added to the National Register of Historic Places in 1984.

References

Presbyterian churches in South Carolina
Churches on the National Register of Historic Places in South Carolina
Churches completed in 1818
19th-century Presbyterian church buildings in the United States
Churches in Fairfield County, South Carolina
National Register of Historic Places in Fairfield County, South Carolina